These hits topped the Ultratop 50 in the Flanders region of Belgium in 1986.

See also
1986 in music

References

1986 in Belgium
1986 record charts
1986